Christopher Jude Sedoris (born April 25, 1973) is a former American football center who played professionally in the National Football League (NFL) for the Washington Redskins. He played college football at Purdue University.

References

1973 births
Living people
American football centers
Purdue Boilermakers football players
Washington Redskins players
Players of American football from Louisville, Kentucky